= Yucatecan =

Yucatecan may refer to:

- The Mexican state of Yucatán
- The Yucatán Peninsula
- The Yucatec Maya language and its speakers
